Nanshan station is an interchange station for Line 11 and Line 12 of the Shenzhen Metro.  Line 11 platforms opened on 28 June 2016 and Line 12 platforms opened on 28 November 2022. The station is located under the intersection of Nanshan Boulevard, Guimiao Road and Binhai Boulevard.

Station layout

Exits

External links
 Shenzhen Metro Nanshan Station (Chinese)
 Shenzhen Metro Nanshan Station (English)

References

Railway stations in Guangdong
Shenzhen Metro stations
Nanshan District, Shenzhen
Railway stations in China opened in 2016